Škoda ForCity is a family of low-floor trams built by Škoda Transportation.  This includes Finnish-made Artic trams branded as ForCity Smart.  ForCity trams were ordered by transport companies of Bonn, Bratislava, Chemnitz, Eskişehir, Espoo/Helsinki, Heidelberg/Ludwigshafen/Mannheim, Konya, Miskolc, Ostrava, Prague, Riga, Schöneiche 
and Tampere. , 823 units were ordered.

References

ForCity